Rear-Admiral Timothy C. Woods is a senior Royal Navy officer who currently serves as Head of the British Defence Staff and Defence Attaché in Washington, D.C.

Naval career
After training at the Britannia Royal Naval College, Woods joined the Royal Navy in 1988. Promoted to commodore on 1 May 2015, and, after serving as British Defence attaché in Kyiv, he became Head of the British Defence Staff and Defence Attaché in Washington, D.C. in January 2023.

References

Royal Navy rear admirals
Year of birth missing (living people)
Living people